The 1911 Penn State Nittany Lions football team was an American football team that represented Pennsylvania State College as an independent during the 1911 college football season. In its second season under head coach Bill Hollenback, the team compiled an 8–0–1 record, shut out seven of nine opponents, and outscored all opponents by a total of 199 to 15. 

There was no contemporaneous system in 1911 for determining a national champion. However, Penn State was retroactively named as the national champion by the National Championship Foundation.

Penn state end Dexter Very was selected by Walter Camp as a second-team player on the 1911 All-America college football team.

Five persons associated with the 1911 Penn State team were later inducted into the College Football Hall of Fame: coach Hollenback (inducted 1951); tackle Dick Harlow (inducted 1954 as a coach); fullback Pete Mauthe (inducted 1957); quarterback Shorty Miller (inducted 1974); and Very (inducted 1976).

Schedule

References

Penn State
Penn State Nittany Lions football seasons
College football national champions
College football undefeated seasons
Penn State Nittany Lions football